Elizabeth Stout (born June 16, 1990) is an American retired professional soccer player who played as a goalkeeper. She is currently a coach with the Southern Illinois Salukis.

Early career
Prior to college, she played for DuPont Manual High School and Mockingbird Valley Soccer Club (which later became Chicago Fire Juniors). Stout also played semi-professionally in the Women's Premier Soccer League following her college career.

Stout played collegiately from 2008 to 2011 at Western Kentucky University, where she set school records for wins, shutouts, goals against average, and save percentage, and recorded 39 shutouts, second in National Collegiate Athletic Association history.

Professional career
Stout played at BV Cloppenburg of Frauen Bundesliga in 2013–14 and FF Yzeure Allier Auvergne of Division 1 Féminine in 2012–13.

Stout played for the Liverpool Ladies during both the 2014 and 2015 seasons. In 2014, she played 13 games, keeping seven clean sheets, to help the club win the 2014 FA WSL title.

On November 23, 2015, the Boston Breakers announced that they had signed Stout. She started 10 matches in 2016, but the Breakers drafted goalkeeper Sammy Jo Prudhomme in the 2017 NWSL College Draft and named Abby Smith the starting keeper of the 2017 season, and Stout did not appear in 2017 before the team waived her in May. However, after an injury to incumbent starter Smith in June, the Breakers re-signed Stout as a goalkeeper replacement on June 21, 2017. Later in 2017, Stout signed for Apollon Limassol of the Cypriot First Division and UEFA Women's Champions League.

After one season with Apollon Limassol, Stout announced her retirement. However, on July 19, 2018, she was signed by the Orlando Pride as a National Team Replacement Player, as Ashlyn Harris was away on international duty.

International
Stout was called up to the United States under-23 training camp in 2013, although she did not appear in a match.

Coaching
In 2018, Stout joined the coaching staff of the Southern Illinois Salukis.

Honors

Club
 Liverpool
 FA Women's Super League (1): 2014
 Liverpool Women's Player's Player of the Year (2014)

Personal
Stout married Cortney Jodoin on February 15, 2020, in a private California wedding. The couple currently resides in Southern Illinois.

References

External links
 Libby Stout – French domestic football stats at footofeminin.fr 
 
 
 
 

Living people
1990 births
Soccer players from Louisville, Kentucky
Western Kentucky Lady Toppers soccer players
American women's soccer players
American expatriate soccer players in Germany
American expatriate sportspeople in France
American expatriate sportspeople in England
Expatriate women's footballers in France
Expatriate women's footballers in England
Women's Super League players
Liverpool F.C. Women players
American expatriate women's soccer players
Women's association football goalkeepers
National Women's Soccer League players
Boston Breakers players
Apollon Ladies F.C. players
Expatriate women's footballers in Cyprus
American expatriate sportspeople in Cyprus
Southern Illinois Salukis women's soccer coaches